The 2016 Los Angeles Angels season was the franchise's 56th season and 51st in Anaheim (all of them at Angel Stadium). They finished in fourth place in the AL West and did not make the playoffs.

The Angels played just four extra-inning games during the season—the fewest of any team in a 162-game season—and lost all four.

Standings

Season standings

American League West

American League Leaders

Record against opponents

Game log

|- bgcolor="ffbbbb"
| 1 || April 4 || Cubs || 0–9 || Arrieta (1–0)  || Richards (0–1)  || — || 44,020 || 0–1 ||L1
|- bgcolor="ffbbbb"
| 2 || April 5 || Cubs || 1–6 || Lester (1–0)  || Heaney (0–1)  || — ||  37,042 || 0–2 ||L2
|- bgcolor="bbffbb"
| 3 || April 7 || Rangers || 4–3 || Street (1–0)  || Dyson (0–1)  || — ||  39,089 || 1–2 ||W1
|- bgcolor="ffbbbb"
| 4 || April 8 || Rangers || 3–7 || Griffin (1–0) || Shoemaker (0–1)  || — ||  35,207 || 1–3 ||L1
|- bgcolor="ffbbbb"
| 5 || April 9 || Rangers || 1–4 || Hamels (2–0)  || Richards (0–2)  || Tolleson (2) || 38,106 || 1–4 ||L2
|- bgcolor="bbffbb"
| 6 || April 10 || Rangers || 3–1 || Weaver (1–0)  || Perez (0–1)  || Street (1) ||  35,097 || 2–4 ||W1
|- bgcolor="bbffbb"
| 7 || April 11 || @ Athletics || 4–1 || Tropeano (1–0)  || Gray (1–1)  || Street (2) ||  13,371 || 3–4 ||W2
|- bgcolor="bbffbb"
| 8 || April 12 || @ Athletics || 5–4 || Morin (1–0) || Doolittle (1–2) || Street (3) ||   13,492 || 4–4 ||W3
|- bgcolor="bbffbb"
| 9 || April 13 || @ Athletics || 5–1 || Shoemaker (1–1) || Surkamp (0–1) || — ||   11,216 || 5–4 ||W4
|- bgcolor="ffbbbb"
| 10 || April 15 || @ Twins || 4–5 || Fien (1–0) ||Salas (0–1) || Jepsen (1)  ||  22,461 || 5–5 ||L1
|- bgcolor="ffbbbb"
| 11 || April 16 || @ Twins || 4–6 ||Pressly (1–0)  || Smith (0–1)|| Jepsen (2) ||  27,464 || 5–6 ||L2
|- bgcolor="ffbbbb"
| 12 || April 17 || @ Twins || 2–3 || Tonkin (1–0) ||Rasmus (0–1) || — ||  25,932 || 5–7 ||L2
|- bgcolor="bbffbb"
| 13 || April 18 || @ White Sox || 7–0 || Santiago (1–0) || Rodon (1–2) || — ||  14,706 || 6–7 ||W1
|- bgcolor="ffbbbb"
| 14 || April 19 || @ White Sox || 0–5 || Latos (3–0) ||Shoemaker (1–2)  ||Jones (1) ||  12,093 || 6–8 ||L1
|- bgcolor="ffbbbb"
| 15 || April 20 || @ White Sox || 1–2 || Sale (4–0) || Richards (0–3)  || Robertson (6)||  12,785  || 6–9 ||L2
|- bgcolor="bbffbb"
| 16 || April 21 || @ White Sox || 3–2 || Weaver (2-0)  || Danks (0-3)  || Street (4) ||  11,418 || 7–9 ||W1
|- bgcolor="ffbbbb"
| 17 || April 22 || Mariners || 2–5 (10) || Peralta (1-0)  || Álvarez (0-1)  || Cishek (4) ||  40,755 || 7–10 ||L1
|-bgcolor="bbffbb"
| 18 || April 23 || Mariners || 4–2 || Santiago (2-0) || Hernández (1-2) || Street (5) ||  41,058 || 8–10 ||W1
|- bgcolor="ffbbbb"
| 19 || April 24 || Mariners || 4–9 || Miley (1-2)  || Shoemaker (1-3) || Vincent (1) ||  37,754 || 8–11 ||L1
|-
|-bgcolor="bbffbb"
| 20 || April 25 || Royals || 6–1 || Richards (1–3)|| Kennedy (2–2) || — ||31,061 || 9–11 ||W1
|-
|-bgcolor="bbffbb"
| 21 || April 26 || Royals || 9–4 || Weaver (3–0) || Vólquez (3–1) || — || 34,428|| 10–11 ||W2
|-
|-bgcolor="bbffbb"
| 22 || April 27 || Royals || 4–2 || Salas (1–1) || Young (1–4) || Smith (1)||  || 11–11 ||W3
|-bgcolor="ffbbbb"
| 23 || April 29 || @ Rangers || 2–4 || Lewis (2-0)  || Santiago (2-1)  || Tolleson (8) ||  || 11–12 ||L1
|-bgcolor="ffbbbb"
| 24 || April 30 || @ Rangers || 2–7 || Holland (3-1)  || Shoemaker (1-4)  || — ||  || 11–13 ||L2
|-

|-
|-bgcolor="bbffbb"
| 25 || May 1 || @ Rangers || 9–6 || Mahle (1–0)|| Wilhelmsen (1–2) || — || 39,401 || 12–13 ||W1
|-bgcolor="ffbbbb"
| 26 || May 2 || @ Brewers || 5–8 || Nelson (4–2) || Weaver (3–1) || — || 21,352  || 12–14 ||L1
|-bgcolor="ffbbbb"
| 27 || May 3 || @ Brewers || 4–5 || Guerra (1–0) || Tropeano (1–1)|| Jeffress (7) || 28,180 || 12–15 ||L2
|-bgcolor="bbffbb"
| 28 || May 4 || @ Brewers || 7–3 || Salas (2–1)|| Thornburg (2–1) || Smith (2) || 21,907 || 13–15 ||W1
|-bgcolor="ffbbbb"
| 29 || May 6 || Rays || 2–5 || Archer (2–4) || Rasmus (0–2) || Colomé (7) || 41,253 || 13–16 ||L1
|-bgcolor="ffbbbb"
| 30 || May 7 || Rays || 2–4 || Ramirez (6–1) || Smith (0–2) || Colomé (8) || 40,148 || 13–17 ||L2
|-bgcolor="ffbbbb"
| 31 || May 8 || Rays || 1–3 || Andreise (1–0) || Tropeano (1–2) || Colomé (9) || 41,086 || 13–18 ||L3
|-bgcolor="ffbbbb"
| 32 || May 10 || Cardinals || 1–8 || Leake (1–3) || Santiago (2–2) || — || 30,679 || 13–19 ||L4
|-bgcolor="ffbbbb"
| 33 || May 11 || Cardinals || 2–5 || Garcia (3–2) || Shoemaker (1–5) || Rosenthal (6) || 33,378 || 13–20 || L5
|-bgcolor="ffbbbb"
| 34 || May 12 || Cardinals || 10–12 || Wainwright (3–3) || Weaver (3–2) || — || 35,413 || 13–21 || L6
|-bgcolor="bbffbb"
| 35 || May 13 || @ Mariners || 7–6 || Smith (1–2) || Cishek (2–2) || Salas (1) || 34,579 || 14–21 || W1
|-bgcolor="bbffbb"
| 36 || May 14 || @ Mariners || 9–7 || Bedrosian (1–0) || Chisek (2–3 || Smith (3) || 42,038 || 15–21 || W2
|-bgcolor="bbffbb"
| 37 || May 15 || @ Mariners || 3–0 || Santiago (3–2) || Hernandez (3–3) || Smith (4) || 40,852 || 16–21 || W3
|-bgcolor="bbffbb"
| 38 || May 16 || @ Dodgers || 7–6 || Shoemaker (2–5) || Maeda (3–3) || Salas (2) || 39,583 || 17–21 || W4
|-bgcolor="ffbbbb"
| 39 || May 17 || @ Dodgers || 1–5 || Kershaw (6–1) || Weaver (3–3) || — || 42,514 || 17–22 || L1
|-bgcolor="bbffbb"
| 40 || May 18 || Dodgers || 1–8 || Tropeano (2–2) || Bolsinger (0–1)|| — || 44,006 || 18–22 || W1
|-bgcolor="bbffbb"
| 41 || May 19 || Dodgers || 7–4 || Alvarez (1–1) || Stripling (1–3) || Smith (5)|| 45,007 || 19–22 || W2 
|-bgcolor="ffbbbb"
| 42 || May 20 || Orioles || 4–9 || Givens (3–0)|| Alvarez (1–2) || — || 40,987 || 19–23 || L1
|-bgcolor="ffbbbb"
| 43 || May 21 || Orioles || 1–3 || Brach (4–0) || Smith (1–3) || Britton (12) || 40,137 || 19–24 || L2
|-bgcolor="bbffbb"
| 44 || May 22 || Orioles || 10–2 || Weaver (4-3) || Jimenez (2–5) || — || 41,280 || 20–24 || W1
|-bgcolor="bbffbb"
| 45 || May 23 || @ Rangers || 2–0 || Tropeano (3–2) || Holland (3–4) || Smith (6) || 25,298 || 21–24 || W2
|-bgcolor="ffbbbb"
| 46 || May 24 || @ Rangers || 1–4 || Perez (2–4) || Chacín (1–3) || Dyson (5) || 26,125 || 21–25 || L1
|-bgcolor="ffbbbb"
| 47 || May 25 || @ Rangers || 9–15 || Lewis (4–0) || Santiago (3–3) || — || 32,480 || 21–26 || L2
|-bgcolor="bbffbb"
| 48 || May 27 || Astros || 7–2 || Shoemaker (3–5) || Fiers (3–3) || — || 39,047 || 22–26 || W1
|-bgcolor="ffbbbb"
| 49 || May 28 || Astros || 2–4 || Keuchel (3–6) || Weaver (4–4) || Gregerson (11) || 38,176 || 22–27 || L1
|-bgcolor="ffbbbb"
| 50 || May 29 || Astros || 6–8 (13)|| Feliz (3–1) || Morin (1–1) || Gregerson (12) || 36,538 || 22–28 || L2
|-bgcolor="bbffbb"
| 51 || May 30 || Tigers || 5–1 || Chacin (2–3) || Verlander (4–5) || — || 38,541 || 23–27 || W1
|-bgcolor="bbffbb"
| 52 || May 31 || Tigers || 11–9 || Street (2–0) || Lowe (1–3) || — || 35,125 || 24–27 || W2
|-

|-bgcolor="ffbbbb"
| 53 || June 1 || Tigers || 0–3 || Fulmer (5–1) || Shoemaker (3–6) || Rodríguez (15) || 35,053 || 24–29 || L1
|-bgcolor="bbffbb"
| 54 || June 3 || @ Pirates || 9–2 || Weaver (5–4) || Liriano (4–5) || — || 27,643 || 25–29 || W1
|-bgcolor="ffbbbb"
| 55 || June 4 || @ Pirates || 7–8 || Locke (5–3) || Salas (2–2) || Melancon (17) || 31,505 || 25–30 || L1
|-bgcolor="bbffbb"
| 56 || June 5 || @ Pirates || 5–4 || Guerra (1–0) || Watson (1–2) || Street (6) || 27,754 || 26–30 || W1
|-bgcolor="ffbbbb"
| 57 || June 6 || @ Yankees || 2–5 || Miller (3–0) || Shoemaker (3–7) || Chapman (10) || 34,648 || 26–31 || L1
|-bgcolor="ffbbbb"
| 58 || June 7 || @ Yankees || 3–6 || Pineda (3–6) || Huff (0–1) || Miller (7) || 31,034 || 26–32 || L2
|-bgcolor="ffbbbb"
| 59 || June 8 || @ Yankees || 6–12 || Swarzak (1–0) || Weaver (5–5) || — || 31,557 || 26–33 || L3
|-bgcolor="ffbbbb"
| 60 || June 9 || @ Yankees || 3–6 || Nova (5–3) || Chacin (2–4) || Chapman (11) || 34,971 || 26–34 || L4
|-bgcolor="ffbbbb" 
| 61 || June 10 || Indians || 2–6 || Kluber (4–6) || Santiago (3–4) || — || 39,487 || 26–35 || L5
|-bgcolor="bbffbb"
| 62 || June 11 || Indians || 4–3 || Salas (3–2) || Shaw (0–2) || — || 38,296 || 27–35 || W1
|-bgcolor="ffbbbb"
| 63 || June 12 || Indians || 3–8 || Salazar (7–3) || Huff (0–2) || — || 36,383 || 27–36 || L1
|-bgcolor="ffbbbb"
| 64 || June 13 || Twins || 4–9 || Nolasco (3–4)|| Weaver (5–6)|| — || 36,424 || 27–37 ||L2 
|-bgcolor="bbffbb"
| 65 || June 14 || Twins || 5–4 || Chacín (3–4) || Santana (1–7) || Street (7) || 36,272 || 28–37 || W1 
|-bgcolor="bbffbb"
| 66 || June 15 || Twins || 10–2 || Santiago (4–4) || Duffey (2–6) || — || 36,717 || 29–37 || W2
|-bgcolor="ffbbbb"
| 67 || June 17 || @ Athletics || 2–3 || Madson (3–2) || Salas (3–3) || — || 24,591 || 29–38 || L1
|-bgcolor="bbffbb"
| 68 || June 18 || @ Athletics || 7–1 || Lincecum (1–0) || Dull (1–2) || — || 25,078 || 30–38 || W1
|-bgcolor="bbffbb"
| 69 || June 19 || @ Athletics || 2–0 || Weaver (6–6) || Surkamp (0–5) || — || 22,846 || 31–38 || W2
|-bgcolor="ffbbbb"
| 70 || June 20 || @ Astros || 7–10 || Fister (8–3) || Chacín (3–5) || — || 25,553 || 31–39 ||L1 
|-bgcolor="ffbbbb"
| 71 || June 21 || @ Astros || 2–3 || Gregerson (1–1) || Street (2–1) || — || 25,004 || 31–40 || L2
|-bgcolor="ffbbbb"
| 72 || June 22 || @ Astros || 2–3 || Gregerson (2–1) || Shoemaker (3–8) || Harris (6) || 29,649 || 31–41 || L3
|-bgcolor="ffbbbb"
| 73 || June 23 || Athletics || 4–5 || Graveman (3–6) || Lincecum (1–1) || Doolittle (4) || 36,412 || 31–42 || L4
|-bgcolor="ffbbbb"
| 74 || June 24 || Athletics || 4–7 || Dull (2–2) || Salas (3–4) || Madson (14) || 41,356 || 31–43 || L5
|-bgcolor="ffbbbb"
| 75 || June 25 || Athletics || 3–7 || Overton (1–0) || Chacín (3–6) || — || 40,643 || 31–44 || L6
|-bgcolor="bbffbb"
| 76 || June 26 || Athletics || 7–6 || Street (3–1)  || Hendriks (0–1)  || — || 36,715 || 32–44 || W1 
|-bgcolor="ffbbbb"
| 77 || June 27 || Astros || 2–4 || Gregerson (3–1) || Salas (3–5) || Will Harris (7) || 36,839 || 32–45 || L1 
|-bgcolor="ffbbbb"
| 78 || June 28 || Astros || 1–7 || Feldman (5–3) || Lincecum (1–2) || — || 38,781 || 32–46 || L2
|-bgcolor="ffbbbb"
| 79 || June 29 || Astros || 4–10 || Keuchel (5–9) || Weaver (6–7) || — || 36,683 || 32–47 || L3
|-

|-bgcolor="ffbbbb"
| 80 || July 1 || @ Red Sox || 4–5 || Wright (9–5) || Chacín (3–7) || Kimbrel (17) || 37,117 || 32–48 || L4
|-bgcolor="bbffbb"
| 81 || July 2|| @ Red Sox || 21–2 || Santiago (5–4) || Buchholz (3–9) || — || 36,552 || 33–48 || W1
|-bgcolor="ffbbbb"
| 82 || July 3 || @ Red Sox || 5–10 || O'Sullivan (2–0) || Shoemaker (3–9) || — || 36,801 || 33–49 || L1
|-bgcolor="ffbbbb"
| 83 || July 4 || @ Rays || 2–4 || Moore (5–5) || Salas (3–6) || — || 14,532 || 33–50 || L2
|-bgcolor="bbffbb"
| 84 || July 5 || @ Rays || 13–5 ||Guerra (2–0)||Odorizzi (3–4)|| — ||14,896|| 34–50 ||W1
|-bgcolor="bbffbb"
| 85 || July 6 || @ Rays || 7–2 || Weaver (7–7) || Smyly (2–10) || — || 11,267 || 35–50 ||W2
|-bgcolor="bbffbb"
| 86 || July 7 || @ Rays ||5–1||Santiago (6–4)||Snell (1–4)|| — ||14,576|| 36–50 ||W3
|-bgcolor="bbffbb"
| 87 || July 8 || @ Orioles || 9–5 ||Shoemaker (4–9)||Jiménez (5–9)|| — ||44,317|| 37–50 ||W4
|-bgcolor="ffbbbb"
| 88 || July 9 || @ Orioles || 2–3 ||Brach (9–1)||Smith (1–4)||Britton (26)||43,288|| 37–51 ||L1
|-bgcolor="ffbbbb"
| 89 || July 10 || @ Orioles || 2–4 ||Tillman 12–2)||Lincecum (1–3)||Britton (27)||32,963|| 37–52 ||L2
|- style="text-align:center; background:#bbcaff;"
| colspan="10" | 87th All-Star Game in San Diego, California|-bgcolor="bbffbb"
| 90 || July 15 || White Sox || 7–0 ||Santiago (7–4)  || González (2–5) || — || 42,031 || 38–52 ||W1 
|-bgcolor="bbffbb"
| 91 || July 16 || White Sox || 1–0 || Shoemaker (5–9) || Shields (4–11) || — || 39,620 || 39–52 ||W2 
|-bgcolor="bbffbb"
| 92 || July 17 || White Sox || 8–1 || Weaver (8–7) || Turner (0–1) || — || 36,834 || 40–52 || W3
|-bgcolor="bbffbb"
| 93 || July 18 || Rangers || 9–5 || Ramirez (2–3) || Kela (1–1) || — || 36,020 || 41–52 ||W4 
|-bgcolor="bbffbb"
| 94 || July 19 || Rangers || 8–6 || Lincecum (2–3) || Lohse (0–2) || Street (8) || 36,368 || 42–52 ||W5 
|-bgcolor="bbffbb"
| 95 || July 20 || Rangers || 7–4 || Santiago (8–4) || Perez (7–7) || — || 37,095 || 43–52 ||W6
|-bgcolor="ffbbbb"
| 96 || July 22 || @ Astros || 1–2 || McCullers (5–4) || Shoemaker (5–10) || Harris (10) || 36,453 || 43–53 || L1
|-bgcolor="ffbbbb"
| 97 || July 23 || @ Astros || 2–7 || McHugh (7–6) || Weaver (8–8) || — || 35,119 || 43–54 || L2
|-bgcolor="ffbbbb"
| 98 || July 24 || @ Astros || 3–13 || Fiers (7–4) || Lincecum (2–4) || — || 32,721 || 43–55 || L3
|-bgcolor="bbffbb"
| 99 || July 25 || @ Royals || 6–2 || Santiago (9–4) || Kennedy (6–9) || — || 33,828|| 44–55 ||W1
|-bgcolor="bbffbb"
| 100 || July 26 || @ Royals || 13–0 || Skaggs (1–0) || Gee (3–4) || — || 28,026 || 45–55 ||W2
|-bgcolor="ffbbbb"
| 101 || July 27 || @ Royals || 5–7 || Soria (4–4) || Shoemaker (5–11) || — || 30,279 || 45–56 || L1
|-bgcolor="bbffbb"
| 102 || July 28 || Red Sox || 2–1 || Bedrosian (2–0) || Ziegler (2–5) || — || 41,257 || 46–56 ||W1
|-bgcolor="ffbbbb"
| 103 || July 29 || Red Sox || 2–6 || Porcello (14–2) || Lincecum (2–5) || — || 39,113 || 46–57 || L1
|-bgcolor="bbffbb"
| 104 || July 30 || Red Sox || 2–5 || Santiago (10–4) || Pomeranz (8–9) || Street (9) || 43,150 || 47–57 ||W1
|-bgcolor="ffbbbb"
| 105 || July 31 || Red Sox || 3–5 || Buchholz (4–9) || Street (3–2) || Ziegler (20) || 39,553 || 47–58 || L1
|-

|-bgcolor="bbffbb"
| 106 || August 2 || Athletics || 5–4 || Shoemaker (6–11) || Manaea (3–6) || Bedrosian (1) || 36,052 || 48–58 ||W1
|-bgcolor="bbffbb"
| 107 || August 3 || Athletics || 8–6 || Morin (2–1) || Dull (5–3) || — || 37,306 || 49–58 ||W2
|-bgcolor="ffbbbb"
| 108 || August 4 || Athletics || 6–8 (10)|| Madson (4-4) || Morin (2-2) || Dull (2) || 34,196 || 49-59 || L1
|-bgcolor="ffbbbb"
| 109 || August 5 || @ Mariners || 4–6 || Hernandez (4–4) || Lincecum (2–6) || Díaz (3) || 40,354 || 49–60 || L2
|-bgcolor="ffbbbb"
| 110 || August 6 || @ Mariners || 6–8 || Storen (2–3) || Valdez (0–1) || Díaz (4) || 45,618 || 49–61 || L3
|-bgcolor="ffbbbb"
| 111 || August 7 || @ Mariners || 1–3 || Paxton (4–5) || Shoemaker (6–12) || Wilhelmsen (1) || 44,812 || 49–62 || L4
|-bgcolor="ffbbbb"
| 112 || August 9 || @ Cubs || 1–5 || Lackey (9–7) || Weaver (8–9) || — || 41,227 || 46–63 || L5
|-bgcolor="ffbbbb"
| 113 || August 10 || @ Cubs || 1–3 || Hammel (12–5) || Nolasco (4–9) || Chapman (24) || 41,015 || 49–64 || L6
|-bgcolor="ffbbbb"
| 114 || August 11 || @ Indians || 4–14 || Kluber (12–8) || Chacín (3–8) || — || 16,652 || 49–65 || L7
|-bgcolor="ffbbbb"
| 115 || August 12 || @ Indians || 3-–13 || Carrasco (8–6) || Skaggs (1–1) || — || 27,014 || 49–66 || L8
|-bgcolor="ffbbbb"
| 116 || August 13 || @ Indians || 1–5 || Clevinger (1–1) || Shoemaker (6–13) || — || 30,409 || 49–67 || L9
|-bgcolor="ffbbbb"
| 117 || August 14 || @ Indians || 4–5 || Bauer (9–5) || Weaver (8–10) || Allen (22) || 18,979 || 49–68 || L10 
|-bgcolor="ffbbbb"
| 118 || August 15 || Mariners || 2–3 || Hernández (7–4) || Nolasco (4–10) || Díaz (7) || 35,840 || 49–69 || L11 
|-bgcolor="bbffbb"
| 119 || August 16 || Mariners || 7–6 || Oberholtzer (3–2) || Caminero (2–3) || Salas (3) || 37,546 || 50–69 || W1 
|-bgcolor="ffbbbb"
| 120 || August 17 || Mariners || 3–4 || Storen (3–3) || Skaggs (1–2) || Díaz (8) || 36,950 || 50–70 || L1
|-bgcolor="bbffbb"
| 121 || August 18 || Mariners || 6–4 || Shoemaker (7–13)  || Iwakuma (14–8)  || — || 37,721 || 51–70 || W1
|-bgcolor="ffbbbb"
| 122 || August 19 || Yankees || 0–7 || Tanaka (10–4) || Weaver (8–11) || — || 40,256 || 51–71|| L1
|-bgcolor="ffbbbb"
| 123 || August 20 || Yankees || 1–5 || Cessa (3–0) || Nolasco (4–11) || — || 44,129 || 52–71|| L2
|-bgcolor="bbffbb"
| 124 || August 21 || Yankees || 2–0 || Chacin (4–8) || Green (2–3) || Salas (4) || 40,309 || 52–72 || W1  
|-bgcolor="ffbbbb"
| 125 || August 23 || @ Blue Jays || 2–7 || Dickey (9–13) || Skaggs (1–3) || — || 46,696 || 52–73|| L1
|-bgcolor="bbffbb"
| 126 || August 24 || @ Blue Jays || 8–2 || Shoemaker (8–13)  || Estrada (7-6)  || — || 44,404 || 53–73 || W1
|-bgcolor="bbffbb"
| 127 || August 25 || @ Blue Jays || 6–3 || Weaver (9-11)  || Happ (17-4)  || — || 46,273 || 54–73 || W2
|-bgcolor="ffbbbb"
| 128 || August 26 || @ Tigers || 2–4 || Verlander (14–7) || Nolasco (4–12) || Rodríguez (36) || 31,357 || 54–74 || L1
|-bgcolor="bbffbb"
| 129 || August 27 || @ Tigers || 3–2 || Chacín (4–6) || Fulmer (10–5)  || Salas (5) || 33,115 || 55–74 || W1 
|-bgcolor="bbffbb"
| 130 || August 28 || @ Tigers || 5–0 || Skaggs (2–3) || Sánchez (7–13) || — || 28,220 || 56–74 || W2 
|-bgcolor="bbffbb"
| 131 || August 29 || Reds || 9–2 || Shoemaker (9–13) || Straily (10–7) || — || 34,161 || 57–74 || W3
|-bgcolor="bbffbb"
| 132 || August 30 || Reds || 4–2 || Weaver (10–11)  || Adleman (2–2)  || Salas (6) || 33,042 || 58–74 || W4
|-bgcolor="bbffbb"
| 133 || August 31 || Reds || 3–0 || Nolasco (5–12)  || Finnegan (8–10)  || — || 34,215 || 59–74 || W5 
|-

|-bgcolor="ffbbbb"
| 134 || September 2 || @ Mariners || 8–11 || Miranda (2–1) || Oberholtzer (3–3) || Díaz (12) || 16,775 || 59–75 || L1
|-bgcolor="bbffbb"
| 135 || September 3 || @ Mariners || 10–3 || Skaggs (3–3) || Walker (4–10) || — || 20,537 || 60–75 || W1
|-bgcolor="bbffbb"
| 136 || September 4 || @ Mariners || 4–2 || Guerra (3–0) || Iwakuma (14–11) || Bailey (1) || 24,033 || 61–75 || W2
|-bgcolor="bbffbb"
| 137 || September 5 || @ Athletics || 10–7 || Valdez (1–1) || Alcántara (0–1) || Bailey (2) || 18,149 || 62–75 || W3
|-bgcolor="ffbbbb"
| 138 || September 6 || @ Athletics || 2–3 || Axford (5–4) || Nolasco (5–13) || Madson (28) || 12,298 || 62–76 || L1
|-bgcolor="ffbbbb"
| 139 || September 7 || @ Athletics || 1–4 || Cotton (1–0) || Meyer (0–2) || Madson (29) || 11,866 || 62–77 || L2
|-bgcolor="ffbbbb"
| 140 || September 9 || Rangers || 1–2 || Bush (7–2) || Ramirez (1–1) || Dyson (33) || 42,137 || 62–78 || L3
|-bgcolor="ffbbbb"
| 141 || September 10 || Rangers || 5–8 || Scheppers (1–0) || Valdez (1–2) || Dyson (34) || 39,146 || 62–79 || L4
|-bgcolor="bbffbb"
| 142 || September 11 || Rangers || 2–3 || Weaver (11–11) || Lewis (6–2) || Bailey (3) || 35,052 || 63–79 || W1
|-bgcolor="ffbbbb"
| 143 || September 12 || Mariners || 1-8 || Miranda (4-1) || Nolasco (5–14) || — || 29,932 || 63-80 || L1
|-bgcolor="ffbbbb"
| 144 || September 13 || Mariners || 0-8 || Walker (6-10) || Meyer (0-3) || — || 32,129 || 63-81 || L2
|-bgcolor="ffbbbb"
| 145 || September 14 || Mariners || 1–2 || Iwakuma (16–11) || Álvarez (1–3) || Díaz (16) || 33,501 || 63–82 || L3
|-bgcolor="ffbbbb"
| 146 || September 15 || Blue Jays || 2–7 || Happ (19–4) || Wright (0–3) || — || 37,559 || 63–83 || L4
|-bgcolor="ffbbbb"
| 147 || September 16 || Blue Jays || 0–5 || Dickey (10–14) || Weaver (11–12) || Osuna (33) || 42,159 || 63–84 || L5
|-bgcolor="bbffbb"
| 148 || September 17 || Blue Jays || 6–1 || Nolasco (6–14) || Liriano (7–13) || — || 39,195 || 64–84 || W1
|-bgcolor="bbffbb"
| 149 || September 18 || Blue Jays || 4–0 || Meyer (1–3) || Stroman (9–9) || — || 36,270 || 65–84 || W2
|-bgcolor="ffbbbb"
| 150 || September 19 || @ Rangers || 2–3 || Dyson (3–2) || Álvarez (1–3) || — || 29,068 || 65–85 || L1
|-bgcolor="ffbbbb"
| 151 || September 20 || @ Rangers || 4–5 || Martinez (2–3) || Wright (0–4) || Dyson (35) || 26,520 || 65–86 || L2 
|-bgcolor="bbffbb"
| 152 || September 21 || @ Rangers || 5–4 || Weaver (12–12) || Holland (7–9) || Bailey (4) || 35,609 || 66–86 || W1
|-bgcolor="bbffbb"
| 153 || September 22 || @ Astros || 2–0 || Nolasco (7–14) || Fiers (11–8) || Bailey (5) || 20,022 || 67–86 || W2 
|-bgcolor="bbffbb"
| 154 || September 23 || @ Astros || 10–6 || Ege (1–0) || Giles (2–5) || — || 29,429 || 68–86 || W3 
|-bgcolor="bbffbb"
| 155 || September 24 || @ Astros || 10–4 || Valdez (2–3) || Gregerson (4–2) || — || 27,565 || 69–86 || W4 
|-bgcolor="ffbbbb"
| 156 || September 25 || @ Astros || 1–4 || Musgrove (4–4) || Wright (0–5) || Giles (14) || 32,958 || 69–87 || L1 
|-bgcolor="bbffbb"
| 157 || September 26 || Athletics || 2–1 || Ramírez (3–4) || Dull (5–5) || Bailey (6) || 29,934 || 70–87 || W1
|-bgcolor="bbffbb"
| 158 || September 27 || Athletics || 8–1 || Nolasco (8–14) || Mengden (2–9) || — || 27,531 || 71–87 || W2  
|-bgcolor="bbffbb"
| 159 || September 28 || Athletics || 8–6 || Achter (1–0) || Detwiler (2–4) || Ramírez (2) || 32,524 || 72–87 || W3 
|-bgcolor="bbffbb"
| 160 || September 30 || Astros || 7–1 || Wright (1–5) || Peacock (0–1) || — || 30,112 || 73–87 || W4   
|-

|-bgcolor="ffbbbb"
| 161 || October 1 || Astros || 0–3 || McHugh (13–10) || Skaggs (3–4) || Giles (15) || 32,487 || 73–88 || L1 
|-bgcolor="bbffbb"
| 162 || October 2 || Astros || 8–1 || Chacín (6–8) || Rodgers (0–1) || 28,083 || 28,083 || 74–88 || W1   
|-

|-
| Legend:       = Win       = Loss       = PostponementBold = Angels team member

Roster

Farm system

LEAGUE CHAMPIONS: Orem

Awards and Statistical Leaders
The following players or coaches won awards or were recognized for their performance during the 2016 season.Mike Trout'American League MVP
Silver Slugger Award for Outfield
Esurance Award for Best Major Leaguer
LA Sports Awards Sportsman of the Year
Bases on balls leader
Runs Scored leader
On-Base Percentage leader
All-Star

See also

Los Angeles Angels
Angel Stadium

References

External links
2016 Los Angeles Angels Official Site
2016 Los Angeles Angels season at Baseball Reference''

Los Angeles Angels
Los Angeles Angels
Los Angeles Angels seasons
2016 in Los Angeles